Clothing (also known as clothes, garments, dress, apparel, or attire) is any item worn on the body. Typically, clothing is made of fabrics or textiles, but over time it has included garments made from animal skin and other thin sheets of materials and natural products found in the environment, put together. The wearing of clothing is mostly restricted to human beings and is a feature of all human societies. The amount and type of clothing worn depends on gender, body type, social factors, and geographic considerations. Garments cover the body, footwear covers the feet, gloves cover the hands, while hats and headgear cover the head. Eyewear and jewelry are not generally considered items of clothing, but play an important role in fashion and clothing as costume.

Clothing serves many purposes: it can serve as protection from the elements, rough surfaces, sharp stones, rash-causing plants, and insect bites, by providing a barrier between the skin and the environment. Clothing can insulate against cold or hot conditions, and it can provide a hygienic barrier, keeping infectious and toxic materials away from the body. It can protect feet from injury and discomfort or facilitate navigation in varied environments. Clothing also provides protection from ultraviolet radiation. It  may be used to prevent glare or increase visual acuity in harsh environments, such as brimmed hats. Clothing is used for protection against injury in specific tasks and occupations, sports, and warfare. Fashioned with pockets, belts, or loops, clothing may provide a means to carry things while freeing the hands.

Clothing has significant social factors as well. Wearing clothes is a variable social norm. It may connote modesty. Being deprived of clothing in front of others may be embarrassing. In many parts of the world, not wearing clothes in public so that genitals, breasts, or buttocks are visible could be considered indecent exposure. Pubic area or genital coverage is the most frequently encountered minimum found cross-culturally and regardless of climate, implying social convention as the basis of customs. Clothing also may be used to communicate social status, wealth, group identity, and individualism.

Some forms of personal protective equipment amount to clothing, such as coveralls, chaps or a doctor's white coat, with similar requirements for maintenance and cleaning as other textiles (boxing gloves function both as protective equipment and as a sparring weapon, so the equipment aspect rises above the glove aspect). More specialized forms of protective equipment, such as face shields are classified protective accessories. At the far extreme, self-enclosing diving suits or space suits are form fitting body covers, and amount to a form of dress, without being clothing per se, while containing enough high technology to amount to more of a tool than a garment. This line will continue to blur as wearable technology embeds assistive devices directly into the fabric itself; the enabling innovations are ultra low power consumption and flexible electronic substrates.

Clothing also hybridizes into a personal transportation system (ice skates, roller skates, cargo pants, other outdoor survival gear, one-man band) or concealment system (stage magicians, hidden linings or pockets in tradecraft, integrated holsters for concealed carry, merchandise-laden trench coats on the black market — where the purpose of the clothing often carries over into disguise). A mode of dress fit to purpose, whether stylistic or functional, is known as an outfit or ensemble.

Origin and history

Early use
Scientists have never agreed on when humans began wearing clothes and estimates suggested by various experts have ranged greatly, from 40,000 to as many as 3 million years ago. 

Recent studies by Ralf Kittler, Manfred Kayser and Mark Stoneking—anthropologists at the Max Planck Institute for Evolutionary Anthropology—have attempted to constrain the most recent date of the introduction of clothing with an indirect method relying on lice. The rationale for this method of dating stems from the fact that the human body louse cannot live outside of clothing, dying after only a few hours without shelter. This strongly implies that the date of the body louse's speciation from its parent, Pediculus humanus, can have taken place no earlier than the earliest human adoption of clothing. This date, at which the body louse (P. humanus corporus) diverged from both its parent species and its sibling subspecies, the head louse (P. humanus capitus), can be determined by the number of mutations each has developed during the intervening time. Such mutations occur at a known rate and the date of last-common-ancestor for two species can therefore be estimated from their frequency. These studies have produced dates from 40,000 to 170,000 years ago, with a greatest likelihood of speciation lying at about 107,000 years ago. 

Kittler, Kayser and Stoneking suggest that the invention of clothing may have coincided with the northward migration of modern Homo sapiens away from the warm climate of Africa, which is thought to have begun between 100,000 and 50,000 years ago. A second group of researchers, also relying on the genetic clock, estimate that clothing originated between 30,000 and 114,000 years ago.

Dating with direct archeological evidence produces dates consistent with those hinted at by lice. In September 2021, scientists reported evidence of clothes being made 120,000 years ago based on findings in deposits in Morocco. However, despite these indications, there is no single estimate that is widely accepted.

According to anthropologists and archaeologists, the earliest clothing likely consisted of fur, leather, leaves, or grass that was draped, wrapped, or tied around the body. Knowledge of such clothing remains inferential, as clothing materials deteriorate quickly compared with stone, bone, shell, and metal artifacts. Archeologists have identified very early sewing needles of bone and ivory from about 30,000 BC, found near Kostenki, Russia in 1988, and in 2016 a needle at least 50,000 years old from Denisova Cave in Siberia made by Denisovans. Dyed flax fibers that could have been used in clothing have been found in a prehistoric cave in the Republic of Georgia that date back to 34,000 BC.

Making clothing

Some human cultures, such as the various peoples of the Arctic Circle, traditionally make their clothing entirely of prepared and decorated furs and skins. Other cultures supplemented or replaced leather and skins with cloth: woven, knitted, or twined from various animal and vegetable fibers including wool, linen, cotton, silk, hemp, and ramie.

Although modern consumers may take the production of clothing for granted, making fabric by hand is a tedious and labor-intensive process involving fiber making, spinning, and weaving. The textile industry was the first to be mechanized – with the powered loom – during the Industrial Revolution.

Different cultures have evolved various ways of creating clothes out of cloth. One approach involves draping the cloth. Many people wore, and still wear, garments consisting of rectangles of cloth wrapped to fit – for example, the dhoti for men and the sari for women in the Indian subcontinent, the Scottish kilt, and the Javanese sarong. The clothes may be tied up (dhoti and sari) or implement pins or belts to hold the garments in place (kilt and sarong). The cloth remains uncut, and people of various sizes can wear the garment.

Another approach involves measuring, cutting, and sewing the cloth by hand or with a sewing machine. Clothing can be cut from a sewing pattern and adjusted by a tailor to the wearer's measurements. An adjustable sewing mannequin or dress form is used to create form-fitting clothing. If the fabric is expensive, the tailor tries to use every bit of the cloth rectangle in constructing the clothing; perhaps cutting triangular pieces from one corner of the cloth, and adding them elsewhere as gussets. Traditional European patterns for shirts and chemises take this approach. These remnants can also be reused to make patchwork pockets, hats, vests, and skirts.

Modern European fashion treats cloth much less conservatively, typically cutting in such a way as to leave various odd-shaped cloth remnants. Industrial sewing operations sell these as waste; domestic sewers may turn them into quilts.

In the thousands of years that humans have been making clothing, they have created an astonishing array of styles, many of which have been reconstructed from surviving garments, photographs, paintings, mosaics, etc., as well as from written descriptions. Costume history can inspire current fashion designers, as well as costumiers for plays, films, television, and historical reenactment.

Clothing as comfort 

Comfort is related to various perceptions, physiological, social, and psychological needs, and after food, it is clothing that satisfies these comfort needs. Clothing provides aesthetic, tactile, thermal, moisture, and pressure comfort.

 Aesthetic comfort: Visual perception is influenced by color, fabric construction, style, garment fit, fashion compatibility, and finish of clothing material. Aesthetic comfort is necessary for psychological and social comfort.
 Thermoregulation in humans and thermophysiological comfort: Thermophysiological comfort is the capacity of the clothing material that makes the balance of moisture and heat between the body and the environment. It is a property of textile materials that creates ease by maintaining moisture and thermal levels in a human's resting and active states. The selection of textile material significantly affects the comfort of the wearer. Different textile fibers have unique properties that make them suitable for use in various environments. Natural fibers are breathable and absorb moisture, and synthetic fibers are hydrophobic; they repel moisture and do not allow air to pass. Different environments demand a diverse selection of clothing materials. Hence, the appropriate choice is  important. The major determinants that influence thermophysiological comfort are permeable construction, heat, and moisture transfer rate.
 Thermal comfort: One primary criterion for our physiological needs is thermal comfort. The heat dissipation effectiveness of clothing gives the wearer a neither very hot nor very cold feel. Thermophysiology reacts whenever the temperature falls below or exceeds the neutral point on either side; it is discomforting below 28 and above 30 degrees. Clothing maintains a thermal balance; it keeps the skin dry and cool. It helps to keep the body from overheating while avoiding heat from the environment.
 Moisture comfort: Moisture comfort is the prevention of a damp sensation. According to Hollies' research, it feels uncomfortable when more than "50% to 65% of the body is wet."
 Tactile comfort: Tactile comfort is a resistance to the discomfort related to the friction created by clothing against the body. It is related to the smoothness, roughness, softness, and stiffness of the fabric used in clothing. The degree of tactile discomfort may vary between individuals, which is possible due to various factors including allergies, tickling, prickling, skin abrasion, coolness, and the fabric's weight, structure, and thickness. There are specific surface finishes (mechanical and chemical) that can enhance tactile comfort. Fleece sweatshirts and velvet clothing, for example. Soft, clingy, stiff, heavy, light, hard, sticky, scratchy, prickly are all terms used to describe tactile sensations.
 Pressure comfort: The comfort of the human body's pressure receptors' (present in the skin) sensory response towards clothing. Fabric with lycra feels more comfortable because of this response and superior pressure comfort. The sensation response is influenced by the material's structure: snugging, looseness, heavy, light, soft, or stiff structuring.

Functions

The most obvious function of clothing is to protect the wearer from the elements. It serves to prevent wind damage and provides protection from sunburn. In the cold, it offers thermal insulation. Shelter can reduce the functional need for clothing. For example, coats, hats, gloves, and other outer layers are normally removed when entering a warm place. Similarly, clothing has seasonal and regional aspects so that thinner materials and fewer layers of clothing generally are worn in warmer regions and seasons than in colder ones. Boots, hats, jackets, ponchos, and coats designed to protect from rain and snow are specialized clothing items.

Clothing has been made from a wide variety of materials, ranging from leather and furs to woven fabrics to elaborate and exotic natural and synthetic fabrics. Not all body coverings are regarded as clothing. Articles carried rather than worn normally are considered accessories rather than clothing (such as Handbags), items worn on a single part of the body and easily removed (scarves), worn purely for adornment (jewelry), or items that do not serve a protective function. For instance, corrective eyeglasses, Arctic goggles, and sunglasses would not be considered an accessory because of their protective functions.

Clothing protects against many things that might injure or irritate the naked human body, including rain, snow, wind, and other weather, as well as from the sun. Garments that are too sheer, thin, small, or tight offer less protection. Appropriate clothes can also reduce risk during activities such as work or sport. Some clothing protects from specific hazards, such as insects, toxic chemicals, weather, weapons, and contact with abrasive substances.

Humans have devised clothing solutions to environmental or other hazards: such as space suits, air conditioned clothing, armor, diving suits, swimsuits, bee-keeper gear, motorcycle leathers, high-visibility clothing, and other pieces of protective clothing. The distinction between clothing and protective equipment is not always clear-cut since clothes designed to be fashionable often have protective value, and clothes designed for function often incorporate fashion in their design. The choice of clothes also has social implications. They cover parts of the body that social norms require to be covered, act as a form of adornment, and serve other social purposes. Someone who lacks the means to procure appropriate clothing due to poverty or affordability, or lack of inclination, sometimes is said to be worn, ragged, or shabby.

Clothing performs a range of social and cultural functions, such as individual, occupational and gender differentiation, and social status. In many societies, norms about clothing reflect standards of modesty, religion, gender, and social status. Clothing may also function as adornment and an expression of personal taste or style.

Scholarship

Function of clothing

Serious books on clothing and its functions appear from the nineteenth century as European colonial powers interacted with new environments such as tropical ones in Asia. Some scientific research into the multiple functions of clothing in the first half of the twentieth century, with publications such as J.C. Flügel's Psychology of Clothes in 1930, and Newburgh's seminal Physiology of Heat Regulation and The Science of Clothing in 1949. By 1968, the field of environmental physiology had advanced and expanded significantly, but the science of clothing in relation to environmental physiology had changed little. There has since been considerable research, and the knowledge base has grown significantly, but the main concepts remain unchanged, and indeed, Newburgh's book continues to be cited by contemporary authors, including those attempting to develop thermoregulatory models of clothing development.

History of clothing

Clothing reveals much about human history. According to Professor Kiki Smith of Smith College, garments preserved in collections are resources for study similar to books and paintings. Scholars around the world have studied a wide range of clothing topics, including the history of specific items of clothing, clothing styles in different cultural groups, and the business of clothing and fashion. The textile curator Linda Baumgarten writes that "clothing provides a remarkable picture of the daily lives, beliefs, expectations, and hopes of those who lived in the past.

Clothing presents a number of challenges to historians. Clothing made of textiles or skins is subject to decay, and the erosion of physical integrity may be seen as a loss of cultural information. Costume collections often focus on important pieces of clothing considered unique or otherwise significant, limiting the opportunities scholars have to study everyday clothing.

Cultural aspects

Gender differentiation

In most cultures, gender differentiation of clothing is considered appropriate. The differences are in styles, colors, fabrics, and types.

In contemporary Western societies, skirts, dresses, and high-heeled shoes are usually seen as women's clothing, while neckties usually are seen as men's clothing. Trousers were once seen as exclusively men's clothing, but nowadays are worn by both genders. Men's clothes are often more practical (that is, they can function well under a wide variety of situations), but a wider range of clothing styles is available for women. Typically, men are allowed to bare their chests in a greater variety of public places. It is generally common for a woman to wear clothing perceived as masculine, while the opposite is seen as unusual. Contemporary men may sometimes choose to wear men's skirts such as togas or kilts in particular cultures, especially on ceremonial occasions. In previous times, such garments often were worn as normal daily clothing by men.

In some cultures, sumptuary laws regulate what men and women are required to wear. Islam requires women to wear certain forms of attire, usually hijab. What items required varies in different Muslim societies; however, women are usually required to cover more of their bodies than men. Articles of clothing Muslim women wear under these laws or traditions range from the head-scarf to the burqa.

Some contemporary clothing styles designed to be worn by either gender, such as T-shirts, have started out as menswear, but some articles, such as the fedora, originally were a style for women.

Social status

During the early modern period, individuals utilized their attire as a significant method of conveying and asserting their social status. Individuals employed the utilization of high-quality fabrics and trendy designs as a means of communicating their wealth and social standing, as well as an indication of their knowledge and understanding of current fashion trends, to the general public. As a result, clothing played a significant role in making the social hierarchy perceptible to all members of society.

In some societies, clothing may be used to indicate rank or status. In ancient Rome, for example, only senators could wear garments dyed with Tyrian purple. In traditional Hawaiian society, only high-ranking chiefs could wear feather cloaks and palaoa, or carved whale teeth. In China, before establishment of the republic, only the emperor could wear yellow. History provides many examples of elaborate sumptuary laws that regulated what people could wear. In societies without such laws, which includes most modern societies, social status is signaled by the purchase of rare or luxury items that are limited by cost to those with wealth or status. In addition, peer pressure influences clothing choice.

Religion

Some religious clothing might be considered a special case of occupational clothing. Sometimes it is worn only during the performance of religious ceremonies. However, it also may be worn every day as a marker for special religious status. Sikhs wear a turban as it is a part of their religion.

In some religions such as Hinduism, Sikhism, Buddhism, and Jainism
the cleanliness of religious dresses is of paramount importance and is considered to indicate purity. Jewish ritual requires rending of one's upper garment as a sign of mourning.  The Quran says about husbands and wives, regarding clothing: "...They are clothing/covering (Libaas) for you; and you for them" (chapter 2:187).Christian clergy members wear religious vestments during liturgical services and may wear specific non-liturgical clothing at other times.

Clothing appears in numerous contexts in the Bible. The most prominent passages are: the story of Adam and Eve who made coverings for themselves out of fig leaves, Joseph's coat of many colors, and the clothing of Judah and Tamar, Mordecai and Esther. Furthermore, the priests officiating in the Temple in Jerusalem had very specific garments, the lack of which made one liable to death.

Contemporary clothing

Western dress code 

The Western dress code has changed over the past 500+ years. The mechanization of the textile industry made many varieties of cloth widely available at affordable prices.  Styles have changed, and the availability of synthetic fabrics has changed the definition of what is "stylish". In the latter half of the twentieth century, blue jeans became very popular, and are now worn to events that normally demand formal attire. Activewear has also become a large and growing market.

In the Western dress code, jeans are worn by both men and women. There are several unique styles of jeans found that include: high rise jeans, mid rise jeans, low rise jeans, bootcut jeans, straight jeans, cropped jeans, skinny jeans, cuffed jeans, boyfriend jeans, and capri jeans.

The licensing of designer names was pioneered by designers such as Pierre Cardin, Yves Saint Laurent, and Guy Laroche in the 1960s and has been a common practice within the fashion industry from about the 1970s. Among the more popular include Marc Jacobs and Gucci, named for Marc Jacobs and Guccio Gucci respectively.

Spread of western styles 

By the early years of the twenty-first century, western clothing styles had, to some extent, become international styles. This process began hundreds of years earlier, during the periods of European colonialism. The process of cultural dissemination has been perpetuated over the centuries, spreading Western culture and styles, most recently as Western media corporations have penetrated markets throughout the world. Fast fashion clothing has also become a global phenomenon. These garments are less expensive, mass-produced Western clothing. Also, donated used clothing from Western countries is delivered to people in poor countries by charity organizations.

Ethnic and cultural heritage 
People may wear ethnic or national dress on special occasions or in certain roles or occupations. For example, most Korean men and women have adopted Western-style dress for daily wear, but still wear traditional hanboks on special occasions, such as weddings and cultural holidays. Also, items of Western dress may be worn or accessorized in distinctive, non-Western ways. A Tongan man may combine a used T-shirt with a Tongan wrapped skirt, or tupenu.

Sport and activity

For practical, comfort or safety reasons most sports and physical activities are practiced wearing special clothing. Common sportswear garments include shorts, T-shirts, tennis shirts, leotards, tracksuits, and trainers. Specialized garments include wet suits (for swimming, diving, or surfing), salopettes (for skiing), and leotards (for gymnastics). Also, spandex materials often are used as base layers to soak up sweat. Spandex is preferable for active sports that require form fitting garments, such as volleyball, wrestling, track and field, dance, gymnastics, and swimming.

Fashion 

Paris set the 1900–1940 fashion trends for Europe and North America. In the 1920s the goal was all about getting loose. Women wore dresses all day, every day. Day dresses had a drop waist, which was a sash or belt around the low waist or hip and a skirt that hung anywhere from the ankle on up to the knee, never above. Daywear had sleeves (long to mid-bicep) and a skirt that was straight, pleated, hank hemmed, or tiered. Jewelry was not conspicuous.  Hair was often bobbed, giving a boyish look.

In the early twenty-first century a diverse range of styles exists in fashion, varying by geography, exposure to modern media, economic conditions, and ranging from expensive haute couture, to traditional garb, to thrift store grunge. Fashion shows are events for designers to show off new and often extravagant designs.

Political issues

Working conditions in the garments industry

Although mechanization transformed most aspects of human clothing industry by the mid-twentieth century, garment workers have continued to labor under challenging conditions that demand repetitive manual labor. Often, mass-produced clothing is made in what are considered by some to be sweatshops, typified by long work hours, lack of benefits, and lack of worker representation. While most examples of such conditions are found in developing countries, clothes made in industrialized nations may also be manufactured under similar conditions.

Coalitions of NGOs, designers (including Katharine Hamnett, American Apparel, Veja, Quiksilver, eVocal, and Edun), and campaign groups such as the Clean Clothes Campaign (CCC) and the Institute for Global Labour and Human Rights as well as textile and clothing trade unions have sought to improve these conditions by sponsoring awareness-raising events, which draw the attention of both the media and the general public to the plight of the workers.

Outsourcing production to low wage countries such as Bangladesh, China, India, Indonesia, Pakistan, and Sri Lanka became possible when the Multi Fibre Agreement (MFA) was abolished. The MFA, which placed quotas on textiles imports, was deemed a protectionist measure. Although many countries recognize treaties such as the International Labour Organization, which attempt to set standards for worker safety and rights, many countries have made exceptions to certain parts of the treaties or failed to thoroughly enforce them. India for example has not ratified sections 87 and 92 of the treaty.

The production of textiles has functioned as a consistent industry for developing nations, providing work and wages, whether construed as exploitative or not, to millions of people.

Fur

The use of animal fur in clothing dates to prehistoric times. Currently, although fur is still used by indigenous people in arctic zones and higher elevations for its warmth and protection, in developed countries it is associated with expensive, designer clothing. Once uncontroversial, recently it has been the focus of campaigns on the grounds that campaigners consider it cruel and unnecessary. PETA, along with other animal rights and animal liberation groups have called attention to fur farming and other practices they consider cruel.

Life cycle

Clothing maintenance
Clothing suffers assault both from within and without. The human body sheds skin cells and body oils, and it exudes sweat, urine, and feces that may soil clothing. From the outside, sun damage, moisture, abrasion, and dirt assault garments. Fleas and lice can hide in seams. If not cleaned and refurbished, clothing becomes worn and loses its aesthetics and functionality (as when buttons fall off, seams come undone, fabrics thin or tear, and zippers fail).

Often, people wear an item of clothing until it falls apart. Some materials present problems. Cleaning leather is difficult, and bark cloth (tapa) cannot be washed without dissolving it. Owners may patch tears and rips, and brush off surface dirt, but materials such as these inevitably age.

Most clothing consists of cloth, however, and most cloth can be laundered and mended (patching, darning, but compare felt).

Laundry, ironing, storage 

Humans have developed many specialized methods for laundering clothing, ranging from early methods of pounding clothes against rocks in running streams, to the latest in electronic washing machines and dry cleaning (dissolving dirt in solvents other than water). Hot water washing (boiling), chemical cleaning, and ironing are all traditional methods of sterilizing fabrics for hygiene purposes.

Many kinds of clothing are designed to be ironed before they are worn to remove wrinkles. Most modern formal and semi-formal clothing is in this category (for example, dress shirts and suits). Ironed clothes are believed to look clean, fresh, and neat. Much contemporary casual clothing is made of knit materials that do not readily wrinkle, and do not require ironing. Some clothing is permanent press, having been treated with a coating (such as polytetrafluoroethylene) that suppresses wrinkles and creates a smooth appearance without ironing. Excess lint or debris may end up on the clothing in between launderings. In such cases, a lint remover may be useful.

Once clothes have been laundered and possibly ironed, usually they are hung on clothes hangers or folded, to keep them fresh until they are worn. Clothes are folded to allow them to be stored compactly, to prevent creasing, to preserve creases, or to present them in a more pleasing manner, for instance, when they are put on sale in stores.

Certain types of insects and larvae feed on clothing and textiles, such as the black carpet beetle and clothing moths. To deter such pests, clothes may be stored in cedar-lined closets or chests, or placed in drawers or containers with materials having pest repellent properties, such as lavender or mothballs. Airtight containers (such as sealed, heavy-duty plastic bags) may deter insect pest damage to clothing materials as well.

Non-iron

A resin used for making non-wrinkle shirts releases formaldehyde, which could cause contact dermatitis for some people; no disclosure requirements exist, and in 2008 the U.S. Government Accountability Office tested formaldehyde in clothing and found that generally the highest levels were in non-wrinkle shirts and pants. In 1999, a study of the effect of washing on the formaldehyde levels found that after six months of routine washing, 7 of 27 shirts still had levels in excess of 75 ppm (the safe limit for direct skin exposure).

Mending
When the raw material – cloth – was worth more than labor, it made sense to expend labor in saving it. In past times, mending was an art. A meticulous tailor or seamstress could mend rips with thread raveled from hems and seam edges so skillfully that the tear was practically invisible. Today clothing is considered a consumable item. Mass-manufactured clothing is less expensive than the labor required to repair it. Many people buy a new piece of clothing rather than spend time mending. The thrifty still replace zippers and buttons and sew up ripped hems, however. Other mending techniques include darning and invisible mending.

Recycling

It is estimated that 80 billion to 150 billion garments are produced annually. Used, unwearable clothing can be repurposed for quilts, rags, rugs, bandages, and many other household uses. Neutral colored or undyed cellulose fibers can be recycled into paper. In Western societies, used clothing is often thrown out or donated to charity (such as through a clothing bin). It is also sold to consignment shops, dress agencies, flea markets, and in online auctions. Also, used clothing often is collected on an industrial scale to be sorted and shipped for re-use in poorer countries. Globally, used clothes are worth $4 billion, with the U.S. as the leading exporter at $575 million.

Synthetics, which come primarily from petrochemicals, are not renewable or biodegradable.

Excess inventory of clothing is sometimes destroyed to preserve brand value.

Global trade

EU member states imported €166 billion of clothes in 2018; 51% came from outside the EU (€84 billion).

EU member states exported €116 billion of clothes in 2018, including 77% to other EU member states.

See also

 Children's clothing
 Clothing fetish
 Clothing laws by country
 Cotton recycling
 Dress code
 Global trade of secondhand clothing
 Higg Index
 List of individual dresses
 Organic cotton
 Reconstructed clothing
 Right to clothing
 Sustainable fashion
 Textile recycling
 Thermoregulation
 Timeline of requisite dress in Western civilization
 Vintage clothing
 Western dress
 Zero-waste fashion

References

Further reading
  ebook 
 
 
 
 
  Paperback 
  (see especially sections 5 – 'Clothing' – & 6 – 'Protective clothing').

External links

 Official website of the Textile and Apparel Association – scholarly publications (archived 16 February 2008)

 
Articles containing video clips